Baecacanthus is a genus of beetles in the family Cerambycidae, which contains Baecacanthus telamon and Baecacanthus trifasciatus. Both species were described be Monné in 1975 in Rio de Janeiro, Brazil.

References

Acanthocinini